A list of films produced in the United Kingdom in 1985 (see 1985 in film):

1985

See also
1985 in British music
1985 in British radio
1985 in British television
1985 in the United Kingdom

References

External links

1985
Films
Lists of 1985 films by country or language